Yingwu Qaghan (Pinyin: Yīngwǔ chén míng  kèhán), was a Khagan of the Yenisei Kyrgyz Khaganate from 847 to 866.

Life
There is no information about the early years of Yingwu Qaghan's life. He came to the throne in 847 after the death of Ajo Qaghan. From 847 to 866 he led successful campaigns in Manchuria and East Turkestan.

Under him, the Yenisei Kyrgyz Khaganate levied tribute from the Tang dynasty in the border areas, it is also known that during his reign the city of Hami and the Chinese fortress of Jinhe were annexed, but there is no exact information whether they were annexed by clashes with the Tang dynasty.

In 848, on his orders, the Kyrgyz minister A-bo made a successful campaign against Shiwei and the Uyghurs who fled there. According to the Old Book of Tang, «He defeated the Shiwei, then gathered all the Uyghurs who were at the Shiwei, and returned them to the north of the Gobi».

The Kyrgyz subsequently increased their pressure on East Turkestan. As a result of the war with the Qocho Kingdom, the cities of Penchul and Aksu were captured. During other campaigns, the cities of Laban, Uqturpan, Jambaliq and Anxi were captured. However, the cities of Beiting and Anxi were lost during clashes with the Uyghur commander Pugu Jun.

Death
Emperor Yizong respected Yingwu Qaghan very much and considered him his relative. In 866, when the Kyrgyz Khagan died from the Tang dynasty, a delegation was sent to participate in the funeral process and farewell gifts and letters, in which the merits of the Khagan were praised, thereby giving him an unprecedented honor. Probably, the embassy that arrived from the Tang dynasty for the funeral of the Khagan of the Kyrgyz in 866 also included specialists called to make a funeral gift; which has not yet been done in the Yenisei Kyrgyz Khaganate.

References

866 deaths
9th-century monarchs in Asia
Year of birth unknown
9th-century Turkic people
History of Kyrgyzstan
Turkic rulers